Andrey Lyskovets (born 7 October 1974) is a Belarusian ski jumper. He competed in the normal hill and large hill events at the 2002 Winter Olympics.

References

1974 births
Living people
Belarusian male ski jumpers
Olympic ski jumpers of Belarus
Ski jumpers at the 2002 Winter Olympics
Sportspeople from Minsk